Luigi Poggi (25 November 1917 – 4 May 2010) was an Italian prelate of the Catholic Church who worked in the diplomatic service of the Holy See from 1946 to 1994, as an archbishop and apostolic nuncio from 1965. After serving as nuncio in several African countries and Peru, he became the Vatican's principal emissary to the Communist countries of Eastern Europe as Popes Paul VI and John Paul II sought renewed engagement with that region. He became a cardinal in 1994. He ended his career in Rome, as Apostolic Nuncio to Italy and then as head of the Vatican Secret Archives and the Vatican Library.

Early life
Born in Piacenza, Poggi did all his studies prior to priestly ordination in that city. He entered the Pontifical Ecclesiastical Academy in 1944 to prepare a career in the diplomatic service of the Holy See. Poggi then joined the Secretariat of State. Poggi headed the mission to investigate the legal status of titular churches in Tunisia in 1963 and 1964.

Papal nuncio

On 3 April 1965, Pope Paul VI named him a titular archbishop and Apostolic Delegate to Central Africa, the region that later became the modern states of Cameroon, Chad, Congo-Brazzaville, Gabon, and the Central African Republic. He received his episcopal consecration from Cardinal Amleto Cicognani on 9 May 1965. As the Vatican established relationships with governments in the region, he was given additional titles: Apostolic Pro-Nuncio to Cameroon on 31 October 1966 Apostolic Pro-Nuncio to Gabon on 31 October 1967, and Apostolic Pro-Nuncio to the Central African Republic on 4 November 1967.

On 21 May 1969, he was named Apostolic Nuncio to Peru.

Ostpolitik

Pope Paul VI used Poggi in his "Ostpolitik", which aimed to improve Vatican relations with the Communist-ruled nations of the Warsaw Pact. On 1 August 1973, Pope Paul assigned him a special role as a nuncio responsible for improving relations with Poland, Hungary, Czechoslovakia, Rumania and Bulgaria. Early in the pontificate of Pope John Paul II, Poggi, an expert in Polish politics, was sent first to Warsaw and then to Moscow. He later visited Prague.

On 7 February 1975, Pope Paul named him to lead a special delegation to Poland.

Final years in Rome
Poggi's final assignment in the diplomatic service was as Apostolic Nuncio to Italy on 19 April 1986.

In 1992, Poggi became Archivist and Librarian of the Holy Roman Church, positions he resigned as required when he turned eighty.

He was made Cardinal-Deacon of Santa Maria in Domnica on 26 November 1994. On 26 February 2002 he became Cardinal Protodeacon, the most senior cardinal of the rank deacon, a role with ceremonial duties during a papal conclave and inauguration. After ten years as a cardinal deacon he took the option to be elevated to Cardinal-Priest of San Lorenzo in Lucina on 24 February 2005, just weeks before the death of Pope John Paul.

He died in Rome on 4 May 2010.

References

External links
 Biography
 Vatican biography

1917 births
2010 deaths
People from Piacenza
Participants in the Second Vatican Council
21st-century Italian cardinals
Protodeacons
Apostolic Nuncios to San Marino
20th-century Italian Roman Catholic titular archbishops
Pontifical Ecclesiastical Academy alumni
Cardinals created by Pope John Paul II
Apostolic Nuncios to Poland
Apostolic Nuncios to Italy
Apostolic Nuncios to the Central African Republic
20th-century Italian cardinals